is a city in central Aichi Prefecture, Japan. , the city had an estimated population of 153,162 in 66,751 households, and a population density of 3,040 persons per km2.

Geography

Kariya is situated in central Aichi Prefecture, on the Mikawa side of the border between former Owari Province and Mikawa Province. The area is flat and well-watered, with an average elevation of less than 10 meters above sea level.

Climate
The city has a climate characterized by hot and humid summers, and relatively mild winters (Köppen climate classification Cfa).  The average annual temperature in Aisai is 15.7 °C. The average annual rainfall is 1578 mm with September as the wettest month. The temperatures are highest on average in August, at around 27.9 °C, and lowest in January, at around 4.4 °C.

Demographics
Per Japanese census data, the population of Kariya has grown steadily over the past 70 years.

Neighboring municipalities
Aichi Prefecture
Toyota
Ōbu
Anjō
Chiryū
Takahama
Toyoake
Miyoshi
Tōgō
Higashiura

History

Middle Ages
Kariya was a castle town in the Sengoku period, in an area contested between the Imagawa clan, Oda clan and various local warlords, including the Mizuno clan and Matsudaira clan.

Early modern period
Tokugawa Ieyasu’s maternal grandfather Mizuno Tadamasa rebuilt Kariya Castle in the mid-16th century. 
The Mizuno clan shifted allegiances adroitly between the Imagawa clan to Oda Nobunaga and to Toyotomi Hideyoshi, who relocated the clan to Ise Province.

However, Mizuno Katsunari, the grandson of Tadamasa was allowed to return to the clan's ancestral territories by Ieyasu after the Battle of Sekigahara as daimyō of Kariya Domain, a feudal han under the Tokugawa shogunate.
The domain was reassigned to numerous clans during the Edo period, but was retained by the Doi clan from 1734 until the Meiji Restoration.

Late modern period
After the Meiji Restoration, Kariya Town was created within Hekikai District, Aichi Prefecture with the establishment of the modern municipalities system on October 1, 1889.
The town prospered as a center for commerce, sake production, sericulture and ceramics due to its location on the main railway routes.
The Yosami Transmitting Station, located in Kariya, was Japan's tallest structure when completed in 1929.

Contemporary history
Kariya achieved city status on April 1, 1950. The city expanded by annexation of neighboring Fujimatsu and most of Yosami villages on April 1, 1955.
Control of the Yosami Transmitting Station was returned to Japan from the United States Navy in 1994, and the former facility is now a city park.

Government

Kariya has a mayor-council form of government with a directly elected mayor and a unicameral city legislature of 28 members. The city contributes two members to the Aichi Prefectural Assembly.  In terms of national politics, the city is part of Aichi District 13 of the lower house of the Diet of Japan.

External relations

Twin towns – Sister cities

International
Mississauga（Ontario, Canada）
since July 6, 1981

National
Higashiyoshino（Nara Prefecture, Kansai region）
since July 1, 2013

Economy

Secondary sector of the economy

Manufacturing
The economy of Kariya is dominated by companies related to the Toyota Group, including Toyota Industries Corporation, Aisin Seiki and Denso Corporation.
Toyota Motor Corporation started as a division of Toyoda Automatic Loom Works (now called Toyota Industries Corporation).
The Toyoda Automatic Loom Works was highly profitable and board members reinvested much of the profits into the growing automobile manufacturing business.

Companies headquartered in Kariya
ADVICS
Aisin
Aska Corporation
DCM Kahma
Denso
JTEKT
Toyota Auto Body
Toyota Boshoku
Toyota Industries

Education

University
Aichi University of Education

Schools
Kariya has 15 public elementary schools and six public junior high schools operated by the city government, and four public high schools operated by the Aichi Prefectural Board of Education. There are also one public high schools operated by the national government.

International School
The Colégio Pitágoras Brasil, a Brazilian school was previously located in Kariya.

Transportation

Railway

Conventional lines
Central Japan Railway Company
Tōkaidō Main Line：-  -  -  -  -
Meitetsu
Meitetsu Nagoya Main Line：-  -  -
Mikawa Line：-  -  -  -

Roads

Expressway
  Isewangan Expressway

Japan National Route

Culture

Festival
Mando Matsuri

Tokusanhin
Dried turnip（Kiriboshi Daikon）

Sports

The city is home to the SeaHorses Mikawa, 5-time champion of Japan's top professional basketball league.

Local attractions
Kariya Highway Oasis
Kariya city Children's traffic park
Kijo Park
Kariya castle
Mississauga Park - in honour of twinning with Mississauga, Ontario and scaled model of Mississauga City Centre
Suhara Park

Notable people from Kariya 

Norihiro Akahoshi, professional baseball player
On Kawara, artist
Koji Kondo, professional soccer player
Nobuyuki Sato, marathon runner
Mitsunori Yoshida, professional soccer player

References

External links

  
 Kariya City official website 
 Mississauga Sister City Site 

 
Cities in Aichi Prefecture